Takkellapadu may refer to:

Places

Andhra Pradesh, India 
Takkellapadu, Guntur district
Takkellapadu, Prakasam district
Thakkellpadu, Nandigama Mandal, Krishna district